The 1994 British Open was a professional ranking snooker tournament, that was held from 30 March to 7 April 1994 at the Plymouth Pavilions, Plymouth, England.
 
Ronnie O'Sullivan won the tournament by defeating James Wattana 9–4 in the final. The defending champion Steve Davis was defeated in the semi-final by Wattana.

There were three notable factors in this year's tournament: There was no title sponsor, there was a new venue, and there was no TV coverage after 14 years of being shown on ITV.



Main draw

Final

References

British Open (snooker)
1994 in snooker
1994 in British sport